"Colour My World" is a song written by American musician James Pankow, one of the founding members of the rock/jazz fusion band Chicago. Part of Pankow's "Ballet for a Girl in Buchannon" song cycle/suite, it was recorded for their second album Chicago, also called Chicago II (1970). Terry Kath sings the lead vocal, and Walter Parazaider performs the memorable flute solo.

The song was initially released as the B-side to "Make Me Smile" in March 1970. It was re-released in June 1971 as the B-side to the re-release of "Beginnings"; this second single reached  on the U.S. Billboard Hot 100.

"Colour My World" is the first significant hit by Chicago to largely abstain from their heavy woodwind and brass oriented sound.  It became a popular "slow dance" song at high school proms, university dances and weddings during the 1970s.

Chicago continues to perform the song, either on its own, or as part of the Ballet. Since Kath's death in 1978 and being brought back into their set list in 1982, lead vocals were performed by Bill Champlin until 1991, when Robert Lamm took the lead. It has been sung by trumpeter Lee Loughnane since 2009.

Frank Sinatra wanted to record a version of the song on the condition that Pankow write an additional verse.  Pankow declined the offer. The song is notable for only containing one verse and the flute solo.

Personnel
 Terry Kath – lead vocals
 Robert Lamm – keyboards
 Peter Cetera – bass
 Danny Seraphine – drums
 Walter Parazaider – flute

Sources

Chicago (band) songs
Songs written by James Pankow
Barbara Fairchild songs
1970 singles
1971 singles
Song recordings produced by James William Guercio
Columbia Records singles
1970 songs